Ganj Afruz may refer to:
 Bala Ganj Afruz
 Pain Ganj Afruz